Wilhelm Eduard Wilda (17 August 1800 – 9 August 1856) was a German jurist of Jewish descent.

He was educated at the Johanneum of Hamburg and the universities of Göttingen, Heidelberg, Kiel, and Copenhagen. The year 1826 was passed partly in Berlin and partly in travel through Germany, France, and Switzerland. After practicing as an attorney at Hamburg from 1826 to 1830, he was appointed assistant professor at Halle, where he remained until 1842, when he was called to Breslau as full professor. In 1854 he was transferred to Kiel.

References 
 

1800 births
1856 deaths
Jurists from Hamburg
19th-century jurists
19th-century German Jews
People educated at the Gelehrtenschule des Johanneums